Venus perseguida is an erotic 1964 Argentine film directed by Uruguayan filmmaker Aldo Brunelli Ventura and starring Argentine bombshell and vedette Vera Váldor. Censorship delayed the commercial release of the film until 1973.

Cast

 Vera Váldor
 Juan Carlos Galván
 Lalo Hartich

External links
 

1964 films
1960s Spanish-language films
Argentine black-and-white films
1960s Argentine films